Sterlington may refer to:

Places
In the United States:
 Sterlington, Louisiana
 Sterlington, New York, a location near the village of Sloatsburg

People with the surname